Horace Hardwick (September 19, 1935 – March 25, 2020) was an American politician who served in the Arkansas House of Representatives from the 99th district from 2003 to 2009.

He died on March 25, 2020, in Bentonville, Arkansas at age 84.

References

1935 births
2020 deaths
Republican Party members of the Arkansas House of Representatives